Syntaxin-10 (STX10) is a SNARE protein that is encoded by the STX10 gene. This protein is found in most vertebrates (including humans) but is noticeably absent from mice.   As with other SNARE proteins, STX10 facilitates vesicle fusion and thus is important for intracellular trafficking  of proteins and other cellular components.  More specifically, STX10 has been implicated in endosome to Golgi trafficking of the mannose 6-phosphate receptor and glucose transporter type 4.

STX10 has been detected in the trans-Golgi network (TGN) by immunofluorescence.

Structure and function 

Human STX10 is a 249 amino acid protein that has three N-terminal α-helices and a single SNARE domain followed by a single-pass transmembrane domain.  Human STX10 is 60% identical to human STX6.

STX10 is structurally classified as a Qc-SNARE (contributes a glutamine (Q) residue in the formation of the assembled core SNARE complex) and is functionally classified as a t-SNARE (or target-SNARE which is often located in the membranes of target compartments).

Interactions 

STX10 is known to interact with the t-SNAREs VTI1A and STX16 and with the v-SNAREs VAMP3 and VAMP4.  The SNARE complex of STX10, STX16, VTI1A, and VAMP3 are required for late endosome to Golgi trafficking of the mannose 6-phosphate receptor.  Early endosome to Golgi trafficking of Shiga toxin requires the SNARE complex of STX6, STX16, VTI1A, and VAMP3 or VAMP4.

Thus, STX10 distinguishes early endosome to Golgi trafficking from late endosome to Golgi trafficking.

References

External links 
 PDBe-KB provides an overview of all the structure information available in the PDB for Human Syntaxin-10 (STX10)